Dale Moss (born September 24, 1988) is an American former football wide receiver and reality television personality. He played college football for the South Dakota State Jackrabbits. After being a member of the offseason and practice squad rosters for the National Football League (NFL)'s Green Bay Packers, Tampa Bay Buccaneers, Chicago Bears, and Carolina Panthers, he played professionally for the Los Angeles Kiss of the Arena Football League (AFL) in 2014. He became engaged to Clare Crawley during 16th season of ABC's The Bachelorette where they left the show early as a couple and ultimately broke up shortly thereafter.

Early life and education
Moss grew up in Brandon, South Dakota, with four sisters. He is the son of Delores and Dale Sr, an interracial couple. The nephew of 1972 Heisman Trophy winner Johnny Rodgers, Moss played basketball, football, and track and field at Brandon Valley High School. 

Moss attended South Dakota State University and majored in consumer affairs/business economics. He played for South Dakota State's basketball team for four years and their football team for one season.

Career

Football
After going undrafted in the 2012 NFL Draft, Moss signed with the Green Bay Packers on May 11, 2012. He was waived at the end of the preseason during final roster cuts on August 31, 2012. He then signed with the practice squad of the Tampa Bay Buccaneers on September 3, 2012, and was released on November 13. Two weeks later, he signed with the practice squad of the Chicago Bears.

After spending the remainder of the 2012 NFL season on the Bears' practice squad, he signed a reserve/futures contract with the team on December 31, 2012. He was waived on June 10, 2013. Moss then was signed by the Carolina Panthers on June 19, 2013, and was waived on August 24, 2013.

Moss was assigned to the Los Angeles Kiss of the Arena Football League in January 2014. After making nine catches for the Kiss, he was placed on recallable reassignment on April 23, 2014. He re-signed with the Chicago Bears on July 29, 2014, and was waived during final roster cuts on August 30, 2014.

The Bachelorette
In July 2020, Moss was named one of 42 potential single men chosen to compete for Clare Crawley on season 16 of the ABC dating competition show The Bachelorette. He eventually made the cast and received the "first impression rose" on the first episode of the season. Crawley selected Moss as her partner in the fourth episode and left the show as a couple before the season's end.

Personal life
Moss serves as a global ambassador for the Special Olympics, after being inspired by his older sister who has an intellectual and physical disability. , Moss resides in New York. He was engaged to Clare Crawley until their split in January 2021, reuniting a month later. They broke up for good in September 2021.

Notes

References

External links

South Dakota State Jackrabbits men's basketball bio
South Dakota State Jackrabbits football bio

1988 births
Living people
People from Brandon, South Dakota
Players of American football from South Dakota
American men's basketball players
American football wide receivers
South Dakota State Jackrabbits men's basketball players
South Dakota State Jackrabbits football players
Green Bay Packers players
Tampa Bay Buccaneers players
Chicago Bears players
Carolina Panthers players
Los Angeles Kiss players
Reality show winners
Bachelor Nation contestants